Talaq (Divorce) is a 1938 Urdu/Hindi social melodrama film directed by Sohrab Modi for Minerva Movietone. The story was written by Anand Kumar and Gajanan Jagirdar with dialogue and lyrics by Anand Kumar. Music was composed by Mir Saheb. Following the debacle of his earlier films based on Shakesperian tragedies like Khoon Ka Khoon (1935) and Said-e-Havas, Modi shifted to making social contemporary dramas like Talaq, Jailor and Meetha Zahar (1938). The film had Naseem Banu in the lead role with Prem Adib, Gajanan Jagirdar, Navin Yagnik, Sheela, and Abu Baker as co-stars.

Roopa (Naseem Banu), a married woman, fights for better divorce laws, which she then employs to be free of her husband. However, things ultimately go against her when her second husband uses the same laws to divorce her.

Plot Outline
Roopa (Naseem Banu) is married to a politician Niranjan (Navin Yagnik) whom she wants to divorce. Niranjan is not in favour of divorce. Helped by the editor Chhabilelal (Gajanan Jagirdar) of a magazine Aandhi, Roopa manages to get certain changes brought in the divorce law that allow her the separation from Niranjan. Niranjan helps a married woman, Shanta (Sheela) and falls in love with her. Due to his sentiments regarding divorce he is unable to marry her. Roopa marries Amarnath (Prem Adib) who then uses the same laws that she had strived to get implemented in order to divorce her.

Cast
 Naseem Banu as Roopa
 Prem Adib as Amarnath
 Gajanan Jagirdar as Chhabilelal
 Navin Yagnik as Niranjan
 Sheela as Shanta
 Abu Baker
 Khwaja Sabir
 Shanta Dutt
 Khan Mastana
 Vimala Vasishth

Subject
The film deals with the social subject of divorce, which being rare in India at that time was also mainly a male prerogative. Focusing on the "rights of women to divorce", Modi’s contemporary social films including Talaq were hugely successful.

References

External links

1938 films
1930s Hindi-language films
1938 drama films
Indian drama films
Films directed by Sohrab Modi
Indian black-and-white films
Melodrama films
Hindi-language drama films